Heavy Duty is a French film directed by Bertrand Blier, starring Gérard Depardieu and Christian Clavier. It premiered on 13 March 2019.

Plot
Two men, one dressed in an overcoat and one dressed in rags, possess a script detailing their lives and deaths.

Cast

Production
The film is produced by Curiosa Films, Ouille Productions and Versus Production, with co-production support from Orange Studio. It reunites Christian Clavier and Gérard Depardieu who previously starred as Asterix and Obelix in two films. It also reunites Blier and Depardieu, who had collaborated on films such as Going Places, Get Out Your Handkerchiefs, Buffet froid and Merci la vie.

Filming began on 16 February 2018 and wrapped up on late March.

References

External links
 

Films directed by Bertrand Blier
French comedy films
2010s French-language films
2019 films
2010s French films